TRUSTcollective is a communications company headquartered in New York City.

History
Founded in 2006 by Adam Fine, communications professional and industry commentator, TRUST represents advertising agencies, branding agencies, retail agencies, design agencies, digital and experiential agencies, technology startups, content creation studios, and small to mid-sized brands.

TRUST's services include public relations, marketing strategy, social media marketing, web design and development, securing public speaking, and media training.

Notable campaigns
TRUST is best known for their work publicizing the Netflix original series Sense8 via the "Brainwave Symphony" campaign, an experiment that measured several subjects' brain activity and arranged them into a single, cohesive song. TRUSTcollective is also known for the viral interactive short film and Facebook app Take This Lollipop, which won a Daytime Emmy Award, two Webby Awards, and three SXSW awards.

The agency received broad recognition for its work popularizing the virtual reality version of South Park for the Oculus Rift. Additionally, TRUST launched a viral campaign at the Cannes Lions festival, entitled HaveYouBeenShortListed. This guerrilla marketing project utilized interactive and experimental content for the iPad shortly after its release.

In 2019, TRUST partnered with Helsinki-based marine and energy solutions company Wärtsilä in collaboration for the Oceanic Awakening - an initiative calling on the world's major port cities to reduce their carbon footprints by the year 2020. A pre-launch workshop in Hamburg, Germany invited US thought leaders and influencers to develop Smart Marine ecosystems for a more sustainable future.

Also, in 2019, TRUST worked directly with Helsinki management consulting group Miltton for “The Greyest Day of the Year” celebration promoting Finland's most popular adult beverage, the Hartwall Original Long Drink. Despite Finland's strict liquor advertising laws, the event resulted in one of the world's largest outdoor campaigns and is on track to becoming a national holiday.

In 2020, TRUST collaborated with influential designer Jessica Walsh to announce the formation of her new company &Walsh. The launch marked the end of the designer’s longtime partnership with collaborator Stefan Sagmeister. TRUST created a multi-tiered communications strategy that raised global awareness of Walsh and her new venture.

Also in 2020, TRUST partnered with agency holding company WPP to announce the launch of Superunion, a creative consultancy formed through the merger of five WPP companies: Brand Union, The Partners, Lambie-Nairn, VBAT and Addison Group. TRUST introduced the company and its unique model of upstream creativity and built brand awareness through key personnel announcements, thought leadership and project promotion.

The communications firm launched Cairo-based street food restaurant Zööba’s first New York location in the city’s trendy Nolita neighborhood. TRUST developed a four-pronged media and social strategy, targeting prominent NYC tastemakers like Grubstreet, Eater, and TimeOut and more, as well as culture, business, and design outlets, with vibrant images of the restaurant and the story of the founders’ mission to bring Egyptian food, culture and sense of community to the United States.

TRUST also helped several Latin American-based companies raise their media profile in 2020. TRUST partnered with Montevideo, Uruguay-headquartered urban design and architecture firm Gómez Platero to promote the firm’s creation of the world’s first large-scale memorial to pandemics. Named “World Memorial to the Pandemic,” the monument symbolizes a deep love for humanity and stands as an emblem of the shared struggle and loss endured during the COVID-19 pandemic.

TRUST also collaborated with Montevideo, Uruguay-based Eyecue Insights, an AI-powered social media analytics platform that released a report on the state of visual diversity and inclusion in the beauty sector.

For Uruguay-based creative innovation company The Electric Factory, TRUST bolstered the company’s international profile with stories that positioned the company executives as leaders of creativity and influence. The strategy also included showcasing not only the company’s digital work, but its interactive experiences, experimental outdoor campaigns and its product designs. For Toyota Uruguay, The Electric Factory created the HY Project (short for “harmony”), a sound design effort for electric cars that is believed to encourage plant growth.

In 2021, tasked with raising the profile of the Uruguayan Chamber of Information Technology (CUTI), TRUST showcased Uruguay’s cultural credibility and standing among tech hubs in LATAM and Europe to secure media opportunities for key leadership. CUTI’s mission is to promote the development and growth of the tech industry in Uruguay and is composed of more than 390 companies that offer products and services to more than 52 markets.

References

Companies established in 2006
Public relations companies of the United States
Marketing companies of the United States
Companies based in New York City